The Balsas shiner (Notropis boucardi) is a species of freshwater fish endemic to Mexico.

Distribution and habitat
Earlier believed to be widespread in the Balsas River drainage, recent studies have shown that it is confined to a small system of streams in the vicinity of its type locality near Cuernavaca, as well as an endorheic spring in nearby Jiutepec, both in the state of Morelos. It inhabits shallow streams with a rocky bottom. The diet consists of insects such as simulids and chironomids.

Description
Balsas shiner have an elongated body and can grow to  total length. The mouth is sub-terminal. The body is silver in color, slightly darker dorsally, and with a black stripe that runs from the eye to the caudal fin. During the reproductive season that peaks in the winter, the ventral region develops bright red coloration.

Conservation
Balsas shiner is considered threatened in Mexico, but its narrow range should qualify it as critically endangered. It has not been assessed by the International Union for Conservation of Nature (IUCN).

References 

Notropis
Freshwater fish of Mexico
Endemic fish of Mexico
Fish described in 1868
Taxa named by Albert Günther